The Center for Computational Brain Research (CCBR) is an Interdisciplinarity research centre located at the Indian Institute of Technology Madras, Chennai, India. CCBR was set up in 2015 with funding from Infosys co-founder Kris Gopalakrishnan. The stated objective of the center is "to explore the interface between Neuroscience and Engineering disciplines".

Research activities
The two broad areas of research at the centre are (1) to exploit engineering tools for analysing the structure and activity of neural circuits
and (2) advancing machine intelligence with brain-inspired hardware and software architecture. The center has 3 chairs with an endowment of 100 million (10 crore) each. These chairs are currently held by distinguished Indian American professors, viz., Partha Mitra (CSHL), Mriganka Sur (MIT) and Anand Raghunathan (Purdue University).

Academic activities
Some of the teaching modules at CCBR are Neuroscience, Machine learning, Vision, Audition, Natural Language Processing and Reinforcement learning. The center has also been organizing an annual winter course/workshop on "Machine Intelligence and Brain Research" during the first week of January.

References

External links
 Official Webpage

Neuroscience research centres in India
Indian Institute of Technology Madras
Research institutes in Chennai
Research institutes in Tamil Nadu
Artificial intelligence laboratories
Research institutes established in 2015
2015 establishments in Tamil Nadu